Amanda Mary Victoria Spielman, MA ACA (born 22 May 1961) serves as HM Chief Inspector of Education, Children's Services and Skills since January 2017.

She joined the senior leadership team at Ark Schools in 2005.  From 2011 to 2016, Spielman was Chair of the Office of Qualifications and Examinations Regulation (Ofqual).

Early life and education
Her mother, Olivia Fiona Robinson, descends via the O'Brien baronets from the Kings of Thomond.

Brought up in the Christian faith and educated first at Notre Dame Primary School in Glasgow, before boarding in Dorset from the age of ten, she joined St Paul's Girls' School's sixth form. She then went to Clare College, Cambridge, to read Mathematics and Law, graduating as BA in 1982.

Her first marriage, in 1983, ended in divorce. She married secondly, in 1996, Adam Justin Spielman MBA, managing director at Citigroup. They live in London and have two children.

Financial industry career
With KMG Thomson McLintock from 1982 to 1986 and then Kleinwort Benson from 1986 to 1992, she served as a director of Newstead Capital from 1992 until 1994 and of Bridgewater Business Analysis from 1994 to 1995.

She became a principal at Mercer Management Consulting in Boston, Massachusetts from 1995 to 1997, then at Nomura Principal Finance from 1997 to 2004.

Education administration
After pursuing further studies in Comparative Education at the Institute of Education, University of London, she received a Master of Arts degree in 2002.

From 2005 onwards Spielman was a founding member of the management team at Ark Schools. From 2011 to 2016 she chaired Ofqual, the examinations and qualifications regulator.

Ofsted appointment
In June 2016, Spielman was selected by the Education Secretary, Nicky Morgan, to take over as Chief Inspector of Office for Standards in Education, Children's Services and Skills (Ofsted) to replace Sir Michael Wilshaw. Following a pre-appointment hearing, Spielman's nomination was rejected by the Education Select Committee which expressed concerns about her suitability, citing her lack of teaching experience and her failure to show "passion" and lack of understanding for the "complex role". Mrs Morgan, however, dismissed such objections and in her capacity as Cabinet minister wrote to Neil Carmichael, the Committee's chairman, confirming her appointment of Mrs Spielman.

In 2021 it was reported she was seeking an extension to her five-year tenure due to the Covid crisis interrupting the roll out of her new inspection framework. A two-year extension was confirmed in May.

Policy positions
In 2018, Spielman supported a primary school headteacher's right to set a uniform policy that did not permit hijab for pupils in Key Stage 1 (ages 4–7). The UK's National Education Union (NEU) described this as “naked racism dressed up as liberalism”.

In 2018, she backed a ban on mobile phones in classrooms. In the same speech, she urged strict pupil discipline, saying ‘there is nothing kind about letting a few pupils spoil school for everyone else.’

In December 2018, Spielman asserted that basic parenting duties should not be outsourced to schools and teachers: for instance, potty training was “a normal part of parenting in every other country” and it was “startling” that any British parents could allow their children to continue wearing nappies for years.

In 2019, she said that students who had sexual assault allegations made against them should be free to continue attending school along with their accusers. This contradicted OFSTED's own guidance and led to criticism that her lack of understanding of basic safeguarding procedures made her unfit to be head of OFSTED.

In June 2021 she declared Years 11 and 13 should be kept in schools despite the cancellation of exams and the substantial extra workload imposed on teachers as a result, and said OFSTED would ‘want to know how’ schools were using contact time with Year 11. This was strongly criticised by teachers as another example of her ignorance of the realities of teaching given that most of Years 11 and 13 saw no point in staying after exams had been cancelled.

See also 
 Spielmann

References

1961 births
Living people
British people of Irish descent
Businesspeople from London
People educated at St Paul's Girls' School
Alumni of Clare College, Cambridge
Alumni of the UCL Institute of Education
British accountants
Civil servants from London